Oscar Emil Landa (born 15 August 1993) is a Norwegian former road cyclist.

Major results

2011
 1st  Road race, National Junior Road Championships
2013
 2nd Trofej Umag
 10th Poreč Trophy
2015
 1st GP Viborg

References

External links

 
 
 

1993 births
Living people
Norwegian male cyclists